Ramos is a surname of Spanish and Portuguese origin that means "bouquets" or "branches". Notable people with the surname include: 

 Adrián Ramos (born 1986), Colombian footballer
 Aldrech Ramos (born 1988), Filipino basketball player
 Alejandra Ramos (born 1958), Chilean middle distance runner
 Alessandra Ramos Makkeda (1981–2022), Brazilian human rights activist
 Alex Ramos (born 1961), American boxer
 Anthony Ramos (born 1991), American actor and singer
 Antonio J. Ramos (born 1947), Puerto Rican United States Air Force officer
 Ariel Ramos (born 1971), Cuban wrestler
 Aurelia Ramos de Segarra (1860-1927), Uruguayan philanthropist
 Bartolomeo Ramos (c. 1440 – 1522), Spanish mathematician, music theorist, and composer
 Benito Ramos (1913–?), Mexican fencer
 Benjamin Ramos (born 1956), Puerto Rican politician
 Cássio Ramos (born 1987), Brazilian football goalkeeper
 Cesar Ramos (disambiguation), multiple people
 Chris Ramos (born 1997), Spanish footballer
 Chucho Ramos (1918–1977), Venezuelan baseball player
 Cláudio Ramos (born 1991), Portuguese football goalkeeper
 Dan Ramos (1981-2023), American politician
 Daniel Ramos (born 1970), Portuguese football manager
 Daniel Ramos (disambiguation), several people
 Davi Ramos (born 1986), Brazilian mixed martial artist
 Eliana Ramos (1988–2007), Uruguayan model
 Fanny Ramos (born 1995), French kickboxer 
 Fidel V. Ramos (19282022), 12th President of the Philippines
 Gonçalo Ramos (born 2001), Portuguese footballer
 Heliot Ramos (born 1999), Puerto Rican baseball player
 Henry Ramos (disambiguation), multiple people
 Humberto Ramos (born 1970), Mexican comic book artist
 Ignacio Ramos (born 1969), US border patrol agent
 Ivone Ramos (1926–2018), Cape Verdean writer
 Jesús "Aguaje" Ramos (born 1951), Cuban trombonist
 Jorge Ramos (news anchor) (born 1958), Mexican journalist and author
 Jorge L. Ramos (born 1950), Puerto Rican Telemundo news anchor
 José Antonio Ramos Sucre (1890–1930), Venezuelan poet, professor, diplomat and scholar
 José Luis Ramos (1790–1849), Venezuelan writer and politician 
 Juande Ramos (born 1954), Spanish footballer and manager
 Julia Ramos (born 1963), Bolivian nurse and politician
 Kid Ramos (born 1959), American electric blues and blues rock guitarist, singer and songwriter
 Lázaro Ramos (born 1978), Brazilian actor, television presenter, director, writer, and voice actor
 Luis Antonio Ramos (born 1973), Puerto Rican-American actor
 Luis Rosendo Ramos (born 1957), Mexican road bicycle racer
 Luisel Ramos (1984–2006), Uruguayan model
 Marcelo Ramos (born 1973), Brazilian footballer
 Marcelo Ramos (born 1972), Uruguayan footballer
 Mel Ramos (1935–2018), American figurative painter
 Mike Ramos (decathlete) (born 1962), American decathlete
 Nathalia Ramos (born 1992), Spanish actress and singer
 Ozzie Ramos (born 1996), American soccer player
 Pedro Senatore Ramos (born 1968), Ecuadorian football (soccer) referee
 Pedro Ramos (born 1935), Cuban baseball player
 Rafael Ramos (born 1965), Puerto Rican boxer
 Rico Ramos (born 1987), American boxer
 Rhian Ramos (born 1990), Filipino actress
 Ruy Ramos (born 1957), Brazilian-Japanese football (soccer) player
 Salvador Rolando Ramos (2004–2022), American mass murderer and perpetrator of the 2022 Robb Elementary School shooting
 Sarah Ramos (born 1991), American actress
 Sergio Ramos (born 1986), Spanish footballer
 Tab Ramos (born 1966), American soccer player
 Thomas Ramos (born 1995), French rugby union player
 Thomas Ramos (born 1992), American soccer player
 Tony Ramos, Brazilian actor
 Verónica Ramos, Bolivian economist, professor, and politician
 Wendell Ramos (born 1978), Filipino actor
 Wilson Ramos (born 1987), Venezuelan baseball player 

Portuguese-language surnames
Spanish-language surnames
Surnames of Filipino origin
Surnames of Puerto Rican origin